The following is a list of Hawthorn Football Club leading goalkickers in each season of the Australian Football League (formerly the Victorian Football League).

AFL Women's leading goalkicker

References
Hawthorn Goalkicking Records

Coaches
Hawthorn Football Club coaches
Hawthorn Football Club coaches